Shiori Fujiwara (born 3 August 1990), also known by her stage name Chiemi Blouson, is a Japanese comedian formerly represented by Watanabe Entertainment.

Biography

2020 hiatus
On 18 March 2020, Fujiwara suddenly announced that she would be leaving Watanabe Entertainment and dropping her "Chiemi Blouson" stage name, citing a "private matter." In subsequent interviews, she expressed a desire to study abroad in Italy and make a series of YouTube videos about her experiences.

Filmography

Television

Entertainment shows

Theatrical animation

Dramas

References

External links
 (Watanabe Entertainment) 
 – Ameba Blog 
 

People from Okayama Prefecture
1990 births
Living people
Japanese women comedians